Chiniquodontidae is an extinct family of basal probainognathian cynodonts that lived in what is now Africa and South America during the Middle and Late Triassic. It is currently thought to include two valid genera: Aleodon and Chiniquodon. Two additional genera (Belesodon and Probelesodon) are usually regarded as junior synonyms of Chiniquodon.

References 

Prehistoric probainognathians
Prehistoric therapsid families
Taxa named by Friedrich von Huene